Madison County Courthouse is a historic courthouse located in Fredericktown, Madison County, Missouri.  It was designed by architect Theodore Link and built in 1900.  It is a two-story, rectangular, eclectic Late Victorian style brick and granite building with an attic and full basement. It measures approximately 66 feet by 76 feet and has a hipped roof. It features a square, five-story tower with a steep pyramidal roof and finial.

It was added to the National Register of Historic Places in 2000.

References

County courthouses in Missouri
Courthouses on the National Register of Historic Places in Missouri
Victorian architecture in Missouri
Government buildings completed in 1900
Buildings and structures in Madison County, Missouri
National Register of Historic Places in Madison County, Missouri